María Esperanza Silva Soura (Santiago, July 12, 1960) is a Chilean actress, theater director and union leader, with a career in theater, film and television. She is the daughter of the prominent Chilean announcer and actor Sergio Silva Acuña.

She studied theater at the University of Chile between 1986 and 1991. That same year she completed a postgraduate degree in theater directing from the Pontificia Universidad Católica de Chile. 

His career in theater began in the 1980s, in works such as Esperando la carroza, La colombiana, the theatrical version of Pantaleón y las visitadoras, and then in the leading role in Ocúpate de Amelia (1990), by George Feydeau, El derrumbe (2002), by Arthur Miller, both directed by Ramón Núñez. In 2005 she acted in Rompiendo Códigos. Fuente Ovejuna by Lope de Vega, directed by Jorge Cano, Colombian director, (1983).

On television she has developed a wide career in humorous spaces and telenovelas such as El milagro de vivir, El palo al gato (1992), Marrón Glacé (1993), Champagne (1994), El amor está de moda (1995), Fuera de control (1999), Tentación (2004), Gatas y tuercas (2005), Viuda Alegre (2008) and Infiltrados (2011). Since the 2000s she has dabbled in series and units such as Tiempo final: en tiempo real (2004–2006), Heredia (2004), Loco por ti (2004), Geografía del deseo (2004), Reporteras (2006), Volver a mí.

She has also participated in the cinema, such as the comedy Mi famosa desconocida (2000), by Edgardo Viereck and the acclaimed Cachimba (2004), by Silvio Caiozzi.

She has developed as a union leader for the actors. She was the founder of the Corporación de Actores de Chile, a body of which she has been its president. She has also served as director of the Corporation of Artists for Rehabilitation and Social Reintegration through Art (COARTRE); she as second vice president of Latin Artist; and as president of the Art Management Foundation. 

In 2013 she became a counselor of National Television Council (CNTV).

Filmography

Films

Telenovelas

TV Series

References 

1960 births
Chilean television actresses
Chilean film actresses
Living people
People from Santiago
Actresses from Santiago
20th-century Chilean actresses
21st-century Chilean actresses